The 1882 Caernarvon Boroughs by-election was a parliamentary by-election held for the House of Commons constituency of Caernarvon Boroughs in North Wales on 30 March 1882.

Vacancy
The by-election was caused by the death of the sitting Liberal MP, William Bulkeley Hughes.

Candidates
Two candidates nominated.

The Liberal Party nominated Welsh landowner Love Jones-Parry.

An Independent Liberal Robert Sorton-Parry also nominated. He was a former Sheriff of Caernarvonshire.

Results

See also
Lists of United Kingdom by-elections

References

1882 in Wales
1880s elections in Wales
1882 elections in the United Kingdom
January 1882 events
History of Gwynedd
Politics of Caernarfonshire
History of Caernarfonshire